The Flash: Vertical Velocity is an inverted steel roller coaster located at Six Flags Great America in Gurnee, Illinois. The roller coaster is themed to the DC Comics character, The Flash. Originally named Vertical Velocity, the ride received a re-theme in 2022.

Manufactured by Intamin under the trade name "Twisted Impulse Coaster", this launched shuttle-style coaster, located in the DC Universe (formerly Yankee Harbor) section of the park, has been operating since May 18, 2001.

History

V2: Vertical Velocity (2001-2021) 
On March 12, 2001, Six Flags Great America announced the addition of two new roller coasters. These were Vertical Velocity and Déjà Vu. Two months later, Vertical Velocity would officially open on May 18, 2001. The ride also had another clone at Six Flags Discovery Kingdom, which was modified in 2002 due to height limit restrictions.

Upon opening, Vertical Velocity became the fastest inverted roller coaster of all time, tying its record with Superman: Ultimate Escape at Geauga Lake and Volcano: The Blast Coaster at Kings Dominion. All three roller coasters were surpassed by Wicked Twister at Cedar Point in 2002. Plus, the attraction became the second tallest inverted roller coaster at the time, behind Busch Gardens Williamsburg's Alpengeist.

The Flash: Vertical Velocity (2022-present) 
Before the 2021 season had begun, the park had teased at an American Coaster Enthusiasts No Coaster Con event that the ride would be re-themed. In September 2021, Vertical Velocity closed temporarily for repainting. The park teased that the new attraction would be themed to The Flash from a sign placed outside of the ride's entrance which read, "Will be back in a Flash in 2022". The supports were repainted red (originally teal) and the track remained yellow.

On March 24, 2022, the park announced the ride to be re-themed to The Flash: Vertical Velocity, which would fit in with the new DC Universe section of the park, becoming the third roller coaster in the area to be themed to a DC Comics hero, following Batman: The Ride and The Joker. The Flash: Vertical Velocity would be themed to the DC Comics superhero The Flash. The station building was painted red with The Flash decals on the front with red painted supports and red trains. The ride re-opened on May 8, 2022, as DC Universe officially re-opened on May 26, 2022.

Ride experience
The coaster's single seven-car (28-passenger) train runs along a 200 m (656 ft) U-shaped track, incorporating two  vertical towers. The forward tower incorporates a twisted spiral and the rearward towering provides a straight freefall.

The 20 m (65 ft) train, propelled by linear induction motors (LIMs), is accelerated in less than four seconds to  toward the forward tower before dropping back down through the station house and up the rearward tower. A holding brake is incorporated on the rear straight tower and was able to suspend the train momentarily (usually on the final ascent during each ride) before dropping it back down to the station house. However, the holding brake has not been used since September 2008 due to maintenance issues. The train passes, at speed, through the station four times per  ride and is smoothly braked by eddy-current braking before being brought into final position at the station by the LIMs.

Vertical Velocity is similar to The Flash: Vertical Velocity at Six Flags Discovery Kingdom, though, the ride was modified a year after both rides opened to the public.

Timeline 
2001 – Construction completed; operation begun. 
2021 – Closed temporarily for a repaint - "Back in a Flash."
2022 – Vertical Velocity was re-themed to The Flash: Vertical Velocity with the addition of DC Universe; ride repainted to red supports.

References

External links 

 Official The Flash: Vertical Velocity website
 The Flash: Vertical Velocity on the Roller Coaster DataBase

Roller coasters operated by Six Flags
Six Flags Great America
Roller coasters introduced in 2001
Roller coasters manufactured by Intamin
Steel roller coasters
Inverted roller coasters
Launched roller coasters
Shuttle roller coasters
Roller coasters in Illinois